Kilroot was a station located in the village of Kilroot, close to the town of Carrickfergus, in Northern Ireland.

At one time it was the last in a tight cluster of stations, each located almost one minute from the other, from Mount railway station through to the halt at Kilroot.

The station closed in 1977 when Northern Ireland Railways services were cut back. It has now been dismantled, and all traces were lost whenever Kilroot power station was constructed in the late 1970s.

References

Disused railway stations in County Antrim
Railway stations opened in 1862
Railway stations closed in 1977
1862 establishments in Ireland
Railway stations in Northern Ireland opened in the 19th century